Anastasia Andreyevna Myskina (born 8 July 1981) is a Russian former professional tennis player. Myskina won the 2004 French Open singles title, becoming the first Russian woman to win a major singles title. Due to this victory, she rose to No. 3 in the Women's Tennis Association (WTA) rankings, becoming the first Russian woman to reach the top 3 in the history of the rankings. In September 2004, she reached a career-high ranking of No. 2. She has not retired officially, but has been inactive on the WTA Tour since May 2007.

Tennis career

1999–2001
Myskina was born in Moscow and turned professional in 1998, the year in which she broke into the WTA top 500. She won her first WTA title in Palermo in only her second appearance in the main draw of a WTA tournament. She made her debut in a Grand Slam tournament at the US Open and the Fed Cup (playing doubles). In 2000, Myskina scored first career top-20 victory over No. 17 Barbara Schett en route to the Sopot semifinal. She debuted at Roland Garros (which she would later win) and Wimbledon. She played in the Sydney Olympics and reached her first Tier I quarterfinal in Zürich, where she lost to world No. 1 Martina Hingis. Myskina was plagued by injury that forced her to miss the Australian Open. As a result, she fell out of the top 100. She then had a solid indoor performance, reaching the quarterfinals in Leipzig and the semifinals in Moscow, her first career Tier I semifinal.

2002
2002 was a breakthrough season for Myskina. She scored her first top-10 win over defending champion Jelena Dokić in Rome, and entered so the top 20. Myskina reached back-to-back grass court finals in Birmingham and Eastbourne, and rose to No. 15 in the rankings. She won her first Tier II 2002 Brasil Open – Women's singles title in Bahia, and another runner-up finish in Leipzig confirmed her spot in WTA Tour Championships. She finished the 2002 season in the top 15 for the first time in her career.

2003
Myskina obtained an invite to play The Hong Kong Ladies Challenge and reached the Australian Open quarterfinals (her first Grand Slam quarterfinal appearance of six). After claiming the title in Doha and defeating friend Elena Likhovtseva in the first all-Russian final in WTA history, she cracked the top 10. Established her place among the game elite with a win in Sarasota, Myskina also had mediocre results during the summer season were followed by a quarterfinal appearance at the US Open, back-to-back titles in Leipzig (defeating No. 1 Kim Clijsters and No. 2 Justine Henin) and Moscow, which was her first Tier I title. She became the first Russian woman to win the Kremlin Cup), and she made the finals in Philadelphia. Myskina qualified for the Tour Championships. She earned more than US$ one million in prize money, and finished the year in the top 10 for the first time in her career.

2004: French Open champion
2004 was Myskina's best season. Myskina successfully defended her Doha title, afterwards becoming the second Russian woman to break into the top 5, the first was Natasha Zvereva, who rose to No. 5 in the world in May 1989. The highlight of Myskina's 2004 season was a victory at the French Open, where she saved match points in the fourth round against Svetlana Kuznetsova, then defeated former world No. 1 players Venus Williams and Jennifer Capriati, en route to a 6–1, 6–2 victory over compatriot Elena Dementieva in the first all-Russian Grand Slam final, thus making her the first female Russian to win a Grand Slam singles title. Prior to her French Open victory, she had never made it past the second round at Roland Garros. Following her win in Paris, she rose to No. 3 in the rankings. She reached the final in San Diego, breaking Maria Sharapova's 14-match winning streak that included Wimbledon and beat Vera Zvonareva 17–15 in a third set tie-break, saving nine match points, winning the longest final set tie-break in WTA Tour history. She lost in the 2004 Athens Olympics semifinal to Justine Henin, having led 5–1 in the final set. She rose to a career-high No. 2 in the rankings. Myskina recovered from the tough loss to win the Kremlin Cup for the second straight year, and beat No. 2 Lindsay Davenport for the first time in five meetings en route to doing so. She finished on the top of her group at the WTA Championships, and scored her second win over a world No. 1 by again beating Davenport, but lost in the semifinals to the eventual champion Sharapova. Myskina led Russia to its first Fed Cup title, winning eight out of nine matches played, including winning all of her three matches in the final. Finished the season as world No. 3, a career-best year-end rank for a female Russian, and won over US$2 million in prize money, having scored ten top-10-wins during the 2004 season.

2005

2005 brought Myskina mixed fortunes. She spent the first half of 2005 poorly, due to personal issues regarding her mother's health. Myskina surrendered her Doha and Roland Garros titles in the very first round, and became the first Roland Garros champion to lose in the opening round. Bringing an 8–10 win–loss record to the beginning of the grass court season, Myskina managed to turn it around at Wimbledon by reaching her career-first quarterfinal at the event with three comeback wins over Jelena Janković (from a 1–5 final set deficit), and over Dementieva (being 1–6, 0–3 down and facing match points in the second set tiebreak). She fell out of the top 10 in August. She then won her tenth career title in Kolkata beating lower-ranked opponents. She also beat the Wimbledon champion Venus Williams in Fed Cup semifinals, but then lost both of her matches in the final. Myskina finished inside top 15 for the fourth straight time.

2006
2006 was another disappointing season for Myskina. Having had several chances to return to the top 10, she failed to convert any of them. In Warsaw, she suffered her worst defeat in terms of the rankings on WTA Tour level, falling to a wildcard, Agnieszka Radwańska, then ranked No. 309. At Roland Garros, Myskina defeated 2005 quarterfinalist Ana Ivanovic in the third round before losing to the eventual champion Justine Henin in the fourth round.

She showed splashes of her old form during the grass season, having reached the Eastbourne final beautifully, losing to Justine Henin-Hardenne in a close final concluded in a third set tiebreak. She made the Wimbledon quarterfinals, but lost to eventual champion Amélie Mauresmo in three sets. She had solid performance at the first two Grand Slams, making the fourth round on each occasion. After Wimbledon, her game completely fell apart. Along with second straight runner-up finish at the Tier IV event in Stockholm, she did not manage to win a single match in North America, going 0–3 during the US Open Series. The downfall reached its nadir when she became the first person to lose a Grand Slam match against future world No. 1 Victoria Azarenka at the US Open, having entered the event under an injury cloud carried over from New Haven. Anastasia sat out for a majority of the indoor season with a foot and toe injury, pulling out of Stuttgart and her home tournament in Moscow. She returned to play in Zürich, but lost to then unknown Swiss qualifier Timea Bacsinszky, 3–6, 3–6.

2007: Struggles with injuries, final year
Myskina only played two singles matches, having been injured. She lost both of those matches; including to Meghann Shaughnessy at the French Open, only winning a game. As of 25 July 2007, Myskina fell to the same ranking as the wildcard she lost to Agnieszka Radwańska, of No. 309. She also is unranked for doubles. Myskina then took time off the tour due to a career-threatening injury, and has been inactive on the WTA tour since then, and is widely considered to have unofficially retired from the sport.

Playing style

Myskina was a baseline player who combined excellent defensive skills with aggressive shot-making abilities. Her two-handed backhand was powerful, and was hit flat and with consistent depth, and was responsible for many of the winners she accumulated on court. Her forehand was also strong, especially when hit inside-out, and could be devastating when Myskina was in good form, but a lack of control sometimes led to a high number of unforced errors when employing this shot. When Myskina was nervous, her second serve became less reliable, leading to a relatively high double fault count. Myskina's greatest strengths as a player were her exceptional speed and court coverage, detailed and precise footwork, anticipation, and ability to improvise as and when the situation required. She also possessed delicate touch, and was able to incorporate drop shots and lobs effectively into points, and frequently hit winners with these typically defensive shots. Due to her doubles experience, she was also an adept volleyer when she chose to approach the net. Myskina's greatest weakness was her inconsistency, which was exacerbated by her fiery temper that was described as "volcanic" by some commentators.

Endorsements and apparel
Myskina was endorsed by Nike for clothing and apparel, and Head for rackets.

Personal life
Myskina dated HC Dynamo Moscow hockey player Aleksandr Stepanov.

In October 2002, she had a series of photos taken for GQ magazine by the photographer Mark Seliger for a spread in the October 2002 edition of GQ, in which one approved photo of her fully clothed was published. After she won the French Open in 2004, some photographs from the shoot, in which she appeared topless, were published in the Russian magazine Medved (Bear).

In August 2004, she filed a US$8 million lawsuit against GQ for allowing her topless photographs to appear in Medved without her consent. On 19 June 2005, U.S. District Judge Michael Mukasey, later United States Attorney General, ruled Myskina could not stop the distribution of the topless photos, because she had signed a release. She had claimed that she did not understand the photo release form and that she was not fluent in English at the time.

Myskina has three sons, born in 2008, 2010, and 2012.

When she was interviewed about parenting with Tennis.com she said: "Being a mother is so different; it’s not that it’s quieter or faster, it’s just different. Being a mom is tough. You understand what’s good for you and the babies, while tennis is just a game. It’s fun because you have a different life when you step on the court but when the baby is sick you go crazy. When I lost a match it was really bad time, now I know it was a great time, so being a mom is tougher." She also made a lot of statements about tennis more benefiting girls than boys: "I think this is absolutely not a male sport. I don't want to offend any male tennis player, but ... our game is not a team game, a sport for egoists. And if women somehow cope, then men — they are so weak. I am for team sports! Friendship, mutual assistance is the best that the team can give."

Significant finals

Grand Slam finals

Singles: 1 (1 title)

Olympic finals

Singles: 1 (4th place)

WTA Tier I finals

Singles: 3 (2 titles, 1 runner-up)

Singles: 2 (1 title, 1 runner-up)

WTA career finals

Singles: 19 (10 titles, 9 runners-up)

Doubles: 6 (5 titles, 1 runner-up)

ITF Circuit finals

Singles: 6 (3 titles, 3 runners-up)

Doubles: 4 (3 titles, 1 runner-up)

Singles performance timeline

Record against other players

Record against top 10 players
Myskina's record against players who have been ranked in the top 10. Active players are in boldface.

No. 1 wins

Top 10 wins

She has a  record against players who were, at the time the match was played, ranked in the top 10.

Awards and honours
ITF World Champion: 2004.
National
 Sports title "Merited Master of Sports of Russia" (2004).
 Sports title "Merited Coach of Russia" (2021).
 Order of Friendship (2009).

See also
 List of Grand Slam women's singles champions

References

External links

 
 
 
 
 Official Anastasia Myskina Website (Russian)
 Official Anastasia Myskina Website (English)

1981 births
Living people
French Open champions
Hopman Cup competitors
Olympic tennis players of Russia
Tennis players from Moscow
Russian female tennis players
Tennis players at the 2000 Summer Olympics
Tennis players at the 2004 Summer Olympics
Grand Slam (tennis) champions in women's singles
ITF World Champions